Agara Bangalore  is a panchayat village in the southern state of Karnataka, India. It is located in the Bangalore South taluk of Bangalore Urban district in Karnataka, on Outer Ring Road, near Koramangala and HSR Layout. The Agara Bus Stop connects Koramangla with ITPL, Varthur, etc. Agara is visited for its Oriyan temple, Agara Lake, Ayyappa Temple & Aanjaneya Temple. After winning the Sreerangapattana war, the British moved their army to Banaglore. In British times, it was one of the biggest army cantonments in south Asia. Madras Engineer Groups was operating from Agara.

References

Neighbourhoods in Bangalore